Xpanse CGI is an Emirati animation design visual effects company that was founded in March 2007 by Ashraf Ghori who currently serves as Xpanse's CEO. The studio originated in and operates from Dubai, UAE. Xpanse CGI is best known for creating Xero Error, the first computer generated science fiction film produced in the UAE which gained regional acclaim and official selection at prominent film festivals internationally.

History 
Xpanse CGI was started in 2007, in Dubai Media City. In addition to their film work, Xpanse also produces commercials, corporate videos, branding, digital art and websites.

Xpanse CGI independently produced Xero Error in 2009. The film had its world premiere at the third Gulf Film Festival, April 2010 in Dubai UAE. It was also shown at the 63rd Festival de Cannes, the tenth edition of Sci-Fi-London and other international film festivals. They were also involved as co-producers of Malal, the first Indo-Emirati film.

Xpanse was featured at the first MEFCC - Middle East Film and Comic Con in April 2012.

Xpanse CGI selected filmography

Accolades 
 2010 (April): Levity Xero Error Minus1, The first computer generated Sci-Fi film from the UAE
 2011 (January): Distinguished Achievement Award for Levity Xero Error Minus1 - Abu Dhabi University
 2011 (February): Winner, Best Filmmaker of the Year - Digital Studio Awards, Dubai
 2011 (February): Runner-up, Animation of the Year : Levity Xero Error Minus1 - Digital Studio Awards, Dubai
 2011 (November): Winner, Best Technology Implementation - SME Advisor Stars of Business Awards
 2011 (November): Winner, Industry Achievement for Events & Entertainment  - SME Advisor Stars of Business Awards
 2011 (November): Nominee, Business Consultancy of the Year  - SME Advisor Stars of Business Awards  
 2012 (February): Nominee, Animation of the Year - Digital Studio Awards, Dubai
 2012 (February): Nominee, Content Creation of the Year - Digital Studio Awards, Dubai
 2012 (February): Nominee, Studio of the Year - Digital Studio Awards, Dubai
 2012 (February): Winner, Best Website Design - Tbreak Developer Awards, Dubai

References

External links
 Official Xpanse CGI website

Visual effects companies
Companies based in Dubai
Mass media companies established in 2007
Emirati animation studios
Web design companies
Mass media companies
Comics publications
2007 establishments in the United Arab Emirates